Mammal Hands are a British band from Norwich. Members include Jordan Smart on  saxophone, Nick Smart on piano and Jesse Barrett on drums and tabla.

Description 
The band's style combines ambient, jazz, electronic music and world music taking in influences including Pharoah Sanders, Gétachèw Mekurya, Terry Riley, Steve Reich and Sirishkumar Manji. All three members contribute equally to the writing process: one that favours the creation of a powerful group dynamic over individual solos.

Mammal Hands have toured with GoGo Penguin; and other landmark live performances have included shows at The Roundhouse London, the main stage at Field Day Festival, La Cigale Paris, Montreal Jazz Festival, Hamburg Elb Jazz, Athens Technopolis and Unit Tokyo.

They have released four critically acclaimed albums: ‘Animalia’ (2014), ‘Floa’ (2016), ‘Shadow Work' (2017) and 'Captured Spirits' (2020) and in 2021 their latest single 'Oni / Lantern'.

Mammal Hands' fifth studio album, ‘Gift from the Trees’ is released 31st of March 2023, on Gondwana Records

Discography

Studio albums

EP

Gallery

External links 

  Mammal Hands homepage
  Bandcamp page
  Official video for the track Boreal Forest in the Gondwana Records Label YouTube stream.
  An interview in  District Magazine from 2018.

References 

British jazz ensembles
Musical groups established in 2012
2012 establishments in England